

Events

January events
 January 13 - Julius Kruttschnitt leaves Union Pacific Railway and succeeds Robert S. Lovett as Chairman of the Executive Committee for the Southern Pacific Railroad.

February events
 February 1 - New York City's Grand Central Terminal opens as the world's largest train station to date.

May events
 May 7 - Tracklaying begins on the Graysonia, Nashville and Ashdown Railroad (a predecessor of Kansas City Southern Railway) between Murfreesboro and Shawmut, Arkansas.

June events
 June 28/29 - Bever–Scuol-Tarasp railway opens in Switzerland.

July events
 July 2 - General Electric produces a gas-electric locomotive which is sold to the Electric Line of Minnesota as its #100 Dan Patch.
 July 15 - Opening of the Bern–Lötschberg–Simplon railway's Lötschberg railway line in Switzerland, including the  Lötschberg Tunnel.

August events
 August 1 - The Alton and Southern Railroad is formed through the merger of the Alton and Southern Railroad Company, the Denverside Connecting Railroad and the Alton and Southern Railway.
 August 13 - Stainless steel (which will soon be used to construct passenger car bodies) is invented by Harry Brearley in Sheffield.
 August 21 - Construction begins on the Morrisburg and Ottawa Electric Railway just south of Billings Bridge, Ottawa.

September events 
 September 1 – Howard Elliott succeeds Charles Sanger Mellen as president of New York, New Haven and Hartford Railroad.

October events 
 October 20 - The Chicago, Burlington and Quincy Railroad's tracks reach Casper, Wyoming, making Casper the busiest rail junction in Wyoming.

December events 
 December 1 - First section of Buenos Aires Metro opened, the earliest metro system in the Southern Hemisphere or the Hispanophone world, and the southernmost.
 December 18 - Korekimi Nakamura steps down as president of South Manchuria Railway.
 December 19 - Ryutaro Nomura succeeds Korekimi Nakamura as president of South Manchuria Railway.
 December 26 - A major fire at its predecessor forces the new Michigan Central Station in Detroit to open early.

Unknown date events
 The Nickel Plate Road completes its grade separation project in Cleveland, Ohio.
 The Supreme Court of the United States orders the Union Pacific Railroad to sell all of its stock in the Southern Pacific Railroad.
 ALCO ceases new steam locomotive production at the former Rogers Locomotive Works plant in Paterson, New Jersey; ALCO continues producing new locomotives at its other plants.
 First examples of Class 140 C steam locomotives delivered to Chemins de Fer de l'État in France; 340 will eventually be built.
 The world’s first rail vehicle with diesel-electric transmission, and the first diesel of any type in regular revenue main line service, a  railcar built by Atlas-Deva/Asea, enters service on the Södermanland Mellersta Railway in Sweden. It will remain in use until 1939.
 The Butte, Anaconda and Pacific Railway, a copper ore-hauling short line in Montana, electrifies using a 2,400 Volts DC system engineered by General Electric, the first primarily freight railroad in North America to electrify.
 Hejaz Railway Station opened in Damascus.
 First on-train cinema set up, on the Trans-Siberian Railway.
 William Finley is succeeded by Fairfax Harrison as president of the Southern Railway.
 Mary Averell Harriman, wife of the late Edward H. Harriman, creates the E. H. Harriman Award to recognize outstanding achievements in railway safety.

Births

April births
 April 21 - Richard Beeching, chairman of the British Railways Board 1961–1965 (died 1985).

December births 
 December 27 - Ian David Sinclair, president of Canadian Pacific Railway 1969-1981, is born (died 2006).

Deaths

March deaths
 March 31 - J. P. Morgan, American financier who helped to finance United States Steel Corporation (born 1837).

April deaths
 April 22 - John Saxby, English railway signalling engineer (born 1821).

May deaths
 May 20 - Henry Morrison Flagler, visionary and builder of the Florida East Coast Railway (born 1830).

September deaths
 September 25 - Herbert William Garratt, English steam locomotive builder and inventor of the Garratt locomotive type (born 1864).

References
 Norfolk Southern Railway.  Retrieved February 22, 2005.
 (July 28, 2005), Significant dates in Ottawa railway history. Retrieved August 16, 2005.